Tulasi Dalam is a 2016 Indian Telugu horror thriller  film directed and produced by R. P. Patnaik. The  film features Nishchal and Vandana Gupta in the lead roles and R. P. Patnaik in an important role with Brahmanandam and Duvvasi Mohan in the supporting roles. The film was released worldwide on 11 March 2016.

Plot
Satvik (Nishchal Deva) who is an orphan moving to Las Vegas to be with his girlfriend, Nisha (Vandana Guptra). He stays in an apartment with a roommate, Subbu (Suneel Boddepalli). Satvik is a staunch non-believer in ghosts, and keeps rubbishing other’s beliefs too. During a heated argument, Subbu challenges Satvik to spend a night in the nearby cemetery, all by himself. Satvik accepts this challenge, and succeeds too. But that’s when the actual trouble starts. Satvik starts experiencing paranormal activities ever since he returns from the graveyard. He starts to notice the spirit of a young girl, Shanti, following him around. Giving up, he finally approaches Dr. Tilak (R. P. Patnaik) who is researching on paranormal activities. Dr. Tilak helps them solve their problems. Who exactly is Shanti? Why is she following Satvik? How does Dr. Tilak help in bringing about peace forms the rest.

Cast
 Nischal as Satvik
 Vandana Gupta as Nisha
 R. P. Patnaik as Dr. Tilak
 Brahmanandam
 Duvvasi Mohan
 Suneel Boddepalli as Subbu 
 Anitha Chowdary

Release
Tulasi Dalam was released on 11 March 2016 across Telangana and Andhra Pradesh.

Reception
Tulasi Dalam received negative response from critics. Y. Sunitha Chowdary of The Hindu found out was the movie was absurd and had an underdeveloped plot.123telugu.com gave the film 2 out of 5 stars and stated that the film was a Lousy Horror Thriller.

References

2010s Telugu-language films
2016 horror thriller films
Indian horror thriller films
2016 horror films
Films set in the Las Vegas Valley
Films shot in the Las Vegas Valley